Mesorhizobium chacoense is a gram-negative, aerobic, non-spore-forming, motile bacteria from the genus of Mesorhizobium which was isolated from root nodules of Prosopis alba in the Chaco Arido region in Argentina.

References

External links
Type strain of Mesorhizobium chacoense at BacDive -  the Bacterial Diversity Metadatabase

Phyllobacteriaceae
Bacteria described in 2001